Holland–Duncan House is a historic home located near Moneta, in Franklin County, Virginia. It was built about 1830, is a two-story, five bay, central passage plan, brick dwelling, with a one-story frame ell with side porch. It has a metal gable roof and exterior end chimneys. The interior features Federal and Greek Revival design details.  Also on the property are a contributing former post office, mounting block and steps, privy, and cemetery.

It was listed on the National Register of Historic Places in 2000.

References

Houses on the National Register of Historic Places in Virginia
Houses completed in 1830
Greek Revival houses in Virginia
Federal architecture in Virginia
Houses in Franklin County, Virginia
National Register of Historic Places in Franklin County, Virginia
1830 establishments in Virginia